George Arthur Fraser (May 17, 1866 – March 2, 1930) was a Canadian politician. He served in the Legislative Assembly of British Columbia from 1903 to 1907  from the electoral district of Grand Forks, as a Conservative.

References

1866 births
1930 deaths
British Columbia Conservative Party MLAs